Researching the Blues is the sixth album by American rock band Redd Kross, released in 2012 on Merge Records.

Reception

Researching the Blues received positive reviews from critics. On Metacritic, the album holds a score of 81/100 based on 25 reviews, indicating "universal acclaim."

Track listing

Personnel
Redd Kross
 Jeff McDonald – vocals, guitar
 Robert Hecker – lead guitar
 Steven McDonald – bass, backing vocals
 Roy McDonald – drums
 Knut "Euroboy" Schreiner – guitar (track 3)
 Anna Waronker – backing vocals (9)

Production
 Steven McDonald – production, mixing

References

External links
 Researching the Blues. AllMusic.
 Researching the Blues. Discogs.
 Researching the Blues. Rate Your Music.

2012 albums
Redd Kross albums
Merge Records albums
Albums recorded at Kingsize Soundlabs